James D. Oberweis (born June 10, 1946) is an American businessman, investment manager, and politician from the state of Illinois. The owner of Oberweis Dairy in North Aurora near Chicago, he served as a member of the Illinois Senate, representing the 25th district from 2013 to 2021.

Oberweis has been a perennial candidate for higher office; he sought the Republican nomination for the United States Senate in 2002 and 2004, and the Republican nomination for Governor of Illinois in 2006. He was the Republican nominee for Illinois's 14th congressional district in a March 2008 special election and the November 2008 general election, losing on both occasions to Democrat Bill Foster. In 2012, Oberweis was first elected to the Illinois Senate in the 25th district. He again ran for the U.S. Senate in 2014, losing to Democratic incumbent Dick Durbin. In 2020, Oberweis ran for a third time in the 14th congressional district, this time losing to Democratic incumbent Lauren Underwood.

Education
After graduating from Marmion Academy in Aurora, Illinois, he attended the University of Illinois at Urbana–Champaign, where he joined Phi Kappa Tau fraternity. He spent a year abroad, studying at Technische Hochschule Darmstadt. He received a Bachelor of Arts from Illinois, and then a Master of Business Administration from the University of Chicago.

Career
In 1968, Oberweis became a junior high school teacher at Waldo Junior High in Aurora, teaching math and science. In 1970, he changed careers and became an investment stockbroker. Within a few years, he was promoted to manager of a branch office.

In 1976, he began publication of an investment newsletter, the Oberweis Report, which reported on emerging growth companies. The Report was rated highly among investment advice newsletters. In 1978, Oberweis and his first wife, Elaine, established their own investment management company, Oberweis Securities in Aurora, Illinois.

In 1986, Oberweis purchased and assumed control of family business Oberweis Dairy. His father, Joe, had died in 1984, and Joe's successor (and Jim's older brother) John suffered an incapacitating stroke in 1986; after Jim's purchase he turned day-to-day operations over to outside presidents who embarked on acquisition programs highly leveraged with debt. Elaine Oberweis (University of Chicago MBA '89) left the brokerage business in 1989 to rescue the dairy business from near-ruin.

He remained active in the investment field. In 1987, he founded Oberweis Emerging Growth Fund. In 1989, he established Oberweis Asset Management (OAM). OAM specializes in "small-cap growth equities investing", and has individual accounts for institutional investors and a family of mutual funds for individual investors. As of 2015, OAM had about $2 billion under management.

Oberweis moved the Oberweis Dairy from Aurora to its present location in North Aurora. He also began a chain of company-owned dairy stores, and has maintained a dairy delivery business to homes in the Chicago area. A franchise program began in 2004, to expand the dairy business outside of northeast Illinois.

Television
Oberweis became a financial news anchor and host of the show Catching Winners Early on the Financial News Network. In Chicago, Oberweis became a regular guest on the Ask an Expert show. Oberweis was also a popular guest on CNBC, CNN, and Bloomberg TV.

Political activity
Oberweis has sought elective office seven times, succeeding in the 2012 race for the 25th State Senate district seat. His record of unsuccessful election campaigns earned him the nickname of "the Milk Dud".

2002 U.S. Senate election

In 2002, Oberweis sought the Republican nomination for U.S. Senator, but lost in the primary, finishing second of three with 31%.

2004 U.S. Senate election

Oberweis ran for Senator again in 2004, but again lost in the primary, finishing second of seven with 24%.

Soon after the primary, the winner, Jack Ryan withdrew due to personal scandal. Some Republicans felt that as the second-place finisher, Oberweis should replace Ryan, but the state central committee chose Alan Keyes instead. Keyes lost to Barack Obama by the largest margin for the Illinois U.S. Senate race in history.

Oberweis's 2004 campaign was notable for a television commercial in which he flew in a helicopter over Chicago's Soldier Field and claimed enough illegal immigrants came into America in a week (10,000 a day) to fill the stadium's 61,500 seats.

During his 2004 Senate campaign, Oberweis appeared in television commercials for Oberweis Dairies. The Federal Election Commission ruled that this was an improper corporate contribution to the campaign, and fined Oberweis $21,000 for violation of campaign finance law.

2006 gubernatorial election

In 2006, Oberweis sought the Republican nomination for Governor of Illinois. He started his campaign in April 2005. He lost in the primary, finishing second of five with 32%. As part of his campaign, he supported amending the Illinois Constitution to define marriage as opposite-sex only. The winner of the primary was Judy Baar Topinka, who was defeated by Democrat Rod Blagojevich in the general election 49.8%–39.3%, with Rich Whitney, the Green Party candidate, receiving a little over 10.3%.

2008 congressional elections

When U.S. Representative Dennis Hastert resigned his seat (Illinois's 14th congressional district) on November 26, 2007, Oberweis ran to replace him. Oberweis was endorsed by Hastert. He won the primary for the special election for the remainder of Hastert's unfinished term with 56%. He also won the primary for the general election for the next term, with 58%.

However, Oberweis lost the March special election to Democrat Bill Foster, getting 47% of the vote to Foster's 53%. He lost to Foster again in November, 58% to 42%.

Illinois Republican Party State Central Committee
During the elections for the State Central Committee in March 2010, Jim Oberweis ran and won a seat on the Illinois Republican Party's State Central Committee representing the 14th Congressional District. In 2013, as State Central Committeeman, Oberweis led the effort to oust former Illinois Republican Party Chairman Pat Brady after his controversial public support of same-sex marriage. While Oberweis's efforts were unsuccessful, Brady eventually resigned because of the controversy.

Oberweis did not run again for the State Central Committee for the election in April 2014.

State Senate
In the 2012 general election, Oberweis won the 25th State Senate seat previously held by Chris Lauzen, his former GOP primary rival in the 2008 congressional race. He had announced his bid in September 2011. He defeated his Democratic opponent, Corinne Pierog, 57.5%–42.5%. In the 2016 general election, Oberweis again defeated Pierog, this time 54.7%–45.3%.

In October 2018, Oberweis was appointed as the Senate Republican Whip. He did not run for re-election in 2020.

Committee assignments
 Commerce and Economic Development
 Environment and Conservation (Minority Spokesperson)
 Executive
 Subcommittee on Election Law
 Labor (Minority Spokesperson)
 Revenue
 Transportation; Subcommittee on Election Law
 Subcommittee on Capital

2014 U.S. Senate election

Oberweis was the Republican nominee for the 2014 Senate election, for the seat held by Democrat Dick Durbin. He defeated Doug Truax in the Republican primary with 56% of the vote. He was defeated by Durbin in the November election.

2020 congressional elections

Oberweis announced he would run again for Illinois's 14th congressional district, challenging Democratic incumbent Lauren Underwood. On March 17, 2020, he won the Republican nomination, narrowly defeating six other candidates including fellow state Senator Sue Rezin, and businesswoman Catalina Lauf.

On November 4, Oberweis, leading by less than 900 votes in the incomplete vote count, declared himself the victor. This came despite the fact that the race had not been called by media outlets and there were still thousands of uncounted mail-in ballots. That same day, Oberweis began sending out fundraising appeals to fund fees associated with a potential recount.

On November 12, the race was called by the Associated Press for Underwood. Oberweis did not concede, and stated that he was considering all legal options, including a possible recount.

Jim Oberweis attended the congressional new member orientation on November 13. He began calling for a "discovery recount" on November 18.

According to the official canvass by the Illinois State Board of Elections, Lauren Underwood received 203,209 votes (50.67 percent) and Jim Oberweis received 197,835 votes (49.33 percent).

In January 2021, Oberweis filed a notice of contest with the U.S. House of Representatives, alleging that irregularities in the vote recount would make him the winner of the election. On May 12, 2021, the House rejected Oberweis' challenge.

Electoral history

Personal life
Jim Oberweis and his first wife, Elaine, had five children together before divorcing in 2003. He has two stepchildren with his second wife, Julie, and twenty grandchildren.

Oberweis is a Roman Catholic.

Oberweis is an avid chess player. In 2013, he had a USCF rating of 1926 (class A). He supported the Fox Valley Chess Club for many years. He also served as President of the Illinois Chess Association for two years, as Illinois delegate to the USCF, and as a trustee of the American Chess Foundation and the Chess Trust Fund.

References

External links

Senator Jim Oberweis (R) 25th District at the 99th Illinois General Assembly
By session: 101st,100th,99th,98th
Illinois State Senator Jim Oberweis constituency site
 Campaign website

 
Profile at OpenStates.org
Profile at Ballotpedia
 

1946 births
21st-century American politicians
American financial businesspeople
Catholics from Illinois
Republican Party Illinois state senators
Living people
People from Sugar Grove, Illinois
Politicians from Chicago
University of Illinois Urbana-Champaign alumni
University of Chicago Booth School of Business alumni
Candidates in the 2002 United States elections
Candidates in the 2004 United States elections
Candidates in the 2006 United States elections
Candidates in the 2008 United States elections
Candidates in the 2014 United States elections
Candidates in the 2020 United States elections
20th-century American businesspeople
21st-century American businesspeople